Christie Mokotupu (born 10 May 1983) is a retired Australian female volleyball player. She was part of the Australia women's national volleyball team.

She competed with the national team at the 2000 Summer Olympics in Sydney, Australia, finishing 9th. She participated in the 2002 FIVB Volleyball Women's World Championship.

See also
 Australia at the 2000 Summer Olympics

References

External links
 
 
 
 
 http://www.capitalbay.news/australia/877362-olympian-christie-mokotupu-lost-her-career-when-she-became-addicted-to-drugs.html
 http://www.smh.com.au/sport/christie-mokotupu-recounts-journey-from-elite-athlete-to-drug-user-20150817-gj0qo1.html

1983 births
Living people
Australian women's volleyball players
People from New South Wales
Volleyball players at the 2000 Summer Olympics
Olympic volleyball players of Australia